Yao Jen-to (born 12 December 1969) is a Taiwanese politician who has been the vice chairperson and secretary-general of Straits Exchange Foundation since 21 June 2018 and a professor of sociology at National Tsing Hua University.

Education
Yao obtained his bachelor's degree in sociology from National Taiwan University and doctoral degree from University of Essex in the United Kingdom.

Political career
Yao had been working as a security adviser to President Tsai Ing-wen when, on 10 August 2016, he was appointed deputy secretary-general of the presidential office. On 20 June 2018 he resigned from the presidential office position and took the role of vice chairperson and secretary-general of Straits Exchange Foundation (SEF) the following day as confirmed by SEF spokesperson.

Political stance
In 2013 during a public forum, Yao as a member of Democratic Progressive Party made a statement that Taiwan independence movement has lost its popularity among the public in Taiwan and urged the Party to facilitate democratization in China by promoting Taiwan's experiences in furthering democracy, freedom and human rights.

References

1969 births
Living people
Political office-holders in the Republic of China on Taiwan
Democratic Progressive Party (Taiwan) politicians